Bruno Lábaque (born November 11, 1977 in Córdoba) is an Argentine former professional basketball player. His position on the field was point guard. Lábaque spent most of his career at Atenas, where he won 12 titles with the team. Lábaque played more the 900 games for Atenas, with near 9,000 points scored.

Career

Club 
Lábaque started his career in Atenas, debuting in the Liga Nacional de Básquet on November 13, 1994 vs. Quilmes (MDP).

On March 8, 2017, Lábaque played his 900th game in the Liga Nacional de Básquet, when Atenas played Estudiantes (Concordia). Lábaque became the 6th player to attend more than 900 games. His best performance was in May 2017 when he scored 41 points in a game.

In May 2017 Lábaque played his last game, when his team, Atenas, lost to Instituto de Córdoba. That night Atenas announced that number "7" would be retired in his honour.

National team 
Lábaque's debut in the Argentina national basketball team was in the 2003 South American Basketball Championship held in Montevideo, against Chile. Lábaque also played the 1997 U-23 World Championship, 2003 PanAmerican Games and the 2004 South American Championship.

Honours

Club 
Atenas
 Liga Nacional de Básquet: (5): 1997-98, 1998–99, 2001–02, 2002–03, 2008–09
 Torneo Copa de Campeones(2): 1998, 1999
 Copa Argentina (1): 2008
 Torneo Super 8 (1): 2010
 Campeonato Panamericano (1): 1996
 Liga Sudamericana (2): 1997, 1998

Individual
 LNB All-Star 2002, 2003, 2007, 2009, 2011, 2015
 N° 7 retired by Atenas

References 

Living people
Argentine people of Syrian descent
1977 births
Argentine expatriate basketball people in Italy
Argentine expatriate basketball people in Spain
Argentine men's basketball players
Atenas basketball players
Basket Rimini Crabs players
Nuova AMG Sebastiani Basket Rieti players
Obras Sanitarias basketball players
Sportspeople from Córdoba Province, Argentina
Point guards
Tenerife CB players